The women's team competition at the 2006 World Team Judo Championships was held on 16 September at the Bercy in Paris, France.

Results

Repechage

References

External links
 

Wteam
World 2006
World Women's Team Judo Championships
World Wteam